Kavalam Chundan is a 1967 Indian Malayalam film, directed by J. Sasikumar and produced by V. P. M. Manikkam. The film stars Sathyan, Sharada, Adoor Bhasi and P. J. Antony in the lead roles. The film had musical score by G. Devarajan.

Cast

Sathyan
Sharada
Adoor Bhasi
P. J. Antony
Adoor Bhavani
Adoor Pankajam
Aranmula Ponnamma
Kaduvakulam Antony
Kottarakkara Sreedharan Nair
Pankajavalli
S. P. Pillai

Soundtrack
The music was composed by G. Devarajan and the lyrics were written by Vayalar Ramavarma.

References

External links
 

1967 films
1960s Malayalam-language films
Films directed by J. Sasikumar